Bonnie on Tour is a live DVD by Welsh singer Bonnie Tyler. It was released in 2006 by Stick Music. The DVD contains footage of Tyler performing at La Cigale in Paris, France, at the 2005 Sopot International Song Festival in Poland, and at an open-air concert in Zaragosa, Spain as well as various bonus content. The majority of songs featured on the DVD are from Tyler's 2005 album Wings, which had been released during the tour.

A CD version of Bonnie on Tour titled Bonnie Tyler Live was released by Stick Music on 9 July 2006.

Background 
Tyler embarked on a European tour to support the release of her fifteenth studio album Wings in 2005. The album was recorded and produced at the Pasteur Studio in Paris, France and many of the session musicians joined Tyler for a series of concerts. The first half of the DVD includes footage from Tyler's concert to celebrate her 54th birthday on 8 June 2005 at La Cigale in Paris. Additional concert footage includes her appearance at the Sopot International Song Festival in Poland in September 2005, and a free open air concert at the Fiestas del Pilar in Zaragoza, Spain on 10 October 2005.

Bonus features include the music video for her 2005 single "Louise" and behind-the-scenes footage on location in Bizerte, Tunisia.

Critical reception 
Tomas Mureika of AllMusic gave the accompanying live CD a positive review, stating that "Tyler is -- at heart -- an amazing live performer and this is a great chronicle of her abilities." His only criticism was that the majority of songs performed were her most recent work, stating that he would have preferred more of "the masterpieces Tyler created with Jim Steinman."

Track listing

Personnel
Credits for Bonnie on Tour adapted from the DVD credits roll.

Musicians

 Bonnie Tyler – lead vocals
 Frédéric Andrews – keyboards
 Sébastien Heurtault – lead guitar
 Stéphane Vaillant – second guitar
 William Andrews – folk guitar
 Gaedic Chambrier – guitar
 David Andrews – bass guitar
 Vincent Antheaume – percussion
 Laurent Locuratolo – drums
 Guillaume Duval – saxophone
 Pascale Andrews – accordion, backing vocals
 John Sombrun – backing vocals
 Binta Dossa – backing vocals
 Angélique Le Goupil – backing vocals
 Elisabeth Andrews – backing vocals
 Delphine Goury – backing vocals
 Floriane Godebout – backing vocals
 Normandy Highland Pipe Band – bagpipes

Production

 Jean Lahcene – producer, recording, editing, mixing
 James Lahcene – engineer
 Fabrice Thomas – DVD authoring
 Lionel Ducos – business manager, DVD authoring
 Robert Sullivan – manager
 François Prieto / pop@work – artwork
 Eric Robert – photography
 DUCS – photography
 Bertrand Levet – photography

Release history

References

External links 

Bonnie Tyler video albums
2006 video albums
Live video albums